The 1981 World Team Classic sponsored by State Express was the new name of the  team snooker tournament. It moved to the Hexagon Theatre in Reading with seven teams competing as the Irish players were divided. Scotland competed for the first time which they lost to the Republic of Ireland in a play off to reach the round robin stage of the competition. All matches including the final were now played in the best of six matches with a tie break frame between the captains if it stayed 3-3. England won their first title with captain Steve Davis winning three of the four matches against Eddie Charlton of Australia, Dennis Taylor of Northern Ireland and Ray Reardon of Wales in the final.

Terry Griffiths made the highest break of the tournament, 123.
 


Main draw
Teams and results are listed below.

Teams

Qualifying round

Group A

Group B

Semi-finals

Final

References

World Cup (snooker)
1981 in snooker